"I Still Love H.E.R." is a song by J-hip-hop group, Teriyaki Boyz released as the first single from their studio album Serious Japanese. The single was produced by and featured American rap artist Kanye West. The track references the 1994 single "I Used to Love H.E.R.," a classic rap song which personified hip-hop as a woman and former love interest, made by West's label mate Common.

Music video
The music video for "I Still Love H.E.R." is essentially a parody of the popular video sharing site YouTube. The video is in fact a video clip, apparently uploaded onto TeriyakiTube, of the Teriyaki Boyz and Kanye West performing the song. The live-action portion of the music video is intercut with still-frame animated scenes of West's mascot Dropout Bear along with cartoon versions of Verbal, Wise, Ilmari, and Ryo-Z in a red convertible trying to woo an attractive woman. The clip ends with H.E.R. hopping into the car and riding off with Dropout and the Teriyaki Boyz before transiting to a black scene which lists the two options "share" or "watch again."

Track listing
 "I Still Love H.E.R." (featuring Kanye West)
 "HeartBreaker" (FULL PHAT REMIX)
 "I Still Love H.E.R." (featuring Kanye West) (Instrumental)

References

2007 singles
Kanye West songs
Song recordings produced by Kanye West
Songs written by Kanye West
Songs written by Verbal (rapper)
2007 songs
Def Jam Recordings singles